Hans Caro (11 August 1928 – 28 July 1972) was a Dutch rower. He competed in the men's coxed four event at the 1952 Summer Olympics.

References

External links
 

1928 births
1972 deaths
Dutch male rowers
Olympic rowers of the Netherlands
Rowers at the 1952 Summer Olympics
People from Wervershoof
Sportspeople from North Holland